Kjeld Petersen (1 July 1920 – 24 May 1962) was a Danish film and stage actor. He appeared in 41 films between 1945 and 1962, and also enjoyed successes as dramatic stage actor and revue comedian, particularly in a crazy comedy duo with Dirch Passer, under the name "The Kellerdirk Brothers", lasting through the 1950s until his death.

He was born in Copenhagen and died in Frederiksberg, Denmark, suffering a stroke in his home following a successful opening performance at the ABC Theatre in which he performed alongside Passer.

In the 2011 Danish Dirch Passer biopic A Funny Man, Petersen was depicted by Lars Ranthe. A 2013 Danmarks Radio documentary series presented Petersen as one of the "Fantastic Four" of Danish comedy, along with Passer, Jørgen Ryg and Preben Kaas.

Filmography

Den usynlige hær - 1945
Far betaler - 1946
Lise kommer til byen - 1947
Tre år efter - 1948
Kampen mod uretten - 1949
Op og ned langs kysten - 1950
Den opvakte jomfru - 1950
Smedestræde 4 - 1950
Fireogtyve timer - 1951
Som sendt fra himlen - 1951
Vores fjerde far - 1951
Unge piger forsvinder i København - 1951
Alt dette og Island med - 1951
Solstik - 1953
I kongens klær - 1954
Det var på Rundetårn - 1955
Blændværk - 1955
Gengæld - 1955
Hvad vil De ha'? - 1956
Færgekroen - 1956
Den store gavtyv - 1956
Hidden Fear - 1957
Skarpe skud i Nyhavn - 1957
Sønnen fra Amerika - 1957
Krudt og klunker - 1958
Pigen og vandpytten - 1958
Seksdagesløbet - 1958
Helle for Helene - 1959
Pigen i søgelyset - 1959
Poeten og Lillemor - 1959
Soldaterkammerater rykker ud - 1959
Vi er allesammen tossede - 1959
Kvindelist og kærlighed - 1960
Skibet er ladet med... - 1960
Den grønne elevator - 1961
Løgn og løvebrøl - 1961
Reptilicus - 1961
Lykkens musikanter - 1962
Det tossede paradis - 1962
Sømænd og svigermødre - 1961

References

External links

1920 births
1962 deaths
Danish male film actors
Best Actor Bodil Award winners
Male actors from Copenhagen
20th-century Danish male actors
Burials at Holmen Cemetery